Chacewater and Kenwyn was an electoral division of Cornwall in the United Kingdom which returned one member to sit on Cornwall Council from 2009 to 2013. The sole Councillor was John Dyer, a Conservative.

The division covered 5096 hectares in total. It was abolished by the Cornwall (Electoral Changes) Order 2011, and Dyer went on to be elected as Councillor for Chacewater, Kenwyn and Baldhu.

Election results

2009 election

References

Electoral divisions of Cornwall Council